Clarence Edward Duren (born December 9, 1950) is a former professional American football player who played safety for five seasons for the St. Louis Cardinals and the San Diego Chargers in the National Football League.

1950 births
Living people
Players of American football from Compton, California
American football safeties
California Golden Bears football players
St. Louis Cardinals (football) players
San Diego Chargers players